The following lists events that happened during 1980 in the Union of Soviet Socialist Republics.

Incumbents
 General Secretary of the Communist Party of the Soviet Union: Leonid Brezhnev (1964–1982)
 Premier of the Soviet Union: Alexei Kosygin (1964–1980)

Events
 19 July–3 August – The Olympics take place in Moscow.
 Soviet–Afghan War

Births
  20 February – Zurab Yevloyev, former Russian professional football player
  12 June – Denys Monastyrsky, Ukrainian politician (died 2023)
  22 June – Ilya Bryzgalov, former Russian ice hockey player

See also
1980 in fine arts of the Soviet Union
List of Soviet films of 1980

References

 
1980s in the Soviet Union
Soviet Union
Soviet Union
Soviet Union